Vietnam Requiem was a 1982 ABC News Closeup television documentary directed by Bill Couturié and Jonas McCord and photographed by Ted Haimes. It is about the post-traumatic stress disorder suffered by veterans. The film comprises interviews with five Vietnam War veterans then in prison for crimes committed after discharge, inter-cut with news footage from the time of the war, with narration by Peter Thomas. After its television broadcast, it was released to educational institutions by Direct Cinema Limited.

Vietnam Requiem provided a substantial part of the sound samples used by Paul Hardcastle in his 1985 song "19".

Awards and nominations
 1982, winner of a News & Documentary Emmy Award for Special Classification for Outstanding Program Achievement - Program
nominated for three News & Documentary Emmy Award for Outstanding Achievement in a Craft in News and Documentary Programming: Cinematography for Ted Haimes, Editing for Stephen Stept, and Ken Melville and Dawn Atkinson for Music Composing
 1982 winner of a Peabody Award for ABC.

References

 Vietnam requiem, .

External links

Vietnam Requiem at Direct Cinema Limited

American documentary television films
Documentary films about the Vietnam War
Films directed by Bill Couturié
Peabody Award-winning broadcasts
Documentary films about post-traumatic stress disorder
ABC News
1982 television films
1982 films
1980s American films